New Market is the largest commercial shopping market in Bangladesh in north of Azimpur, Dhaka. It is situated on the opposite side of Chandni Chowk.

History
The market was set up 1954 as a shopping complex, to cater to the needs of the people from the residential areas of University of Dhaka, Azimpur and Dhanmondi.

Construction began in 1952, on 35 acres of land during the tenure of Nurul Amin as the Chief Minister of East Bengal. Construction ended in 1954.

Today the market has multiple buildings as well as sidewalk vendors.

Architecture
New Market area is triangular in shape with high arched entry gates on three sides. There were spaces for 440 shops and a triangular lawn at the center.

Legacy

During 1950's to early 1990's, it was the most popular place for shopping as well as recreation. Novelty, an ice-cream shop, was one of the most popular destinations of the young people. During the 1980s, 3 more New Market blocks were constructed on the north under Dhaka City Corporation, for example, New Super Market for crockeries, Bonolata for kitchen market, Chandrima and Gausia market for varieties of items and D block for groceries, each having over thousand shops. A park inside has been converted into a mosque at first floor level with sixty new shops under it.

Gallery

References

External links
 Official website

 Neighbourhoods in Dhaka
Economy of Dhaka
Buildings and structures in Dhaka
Tourist attractions in Dhaka
Retail markets in Bangladesh